Svobodny Urban Okrug is the name of several municipal formations in Russia. The following administrative divisions are incorporated as such:
Svobodny Urban Okrug, Amur Oblast
Closed Administrative-Territorial Formation of Svobodny, Sverdlovsk Oblast

See also
Svobodny (disambiguation)

References